The Ivory Coast Women's Cup is a women's association football competition in Ivory Coast. pitting regional teams against each other. It was established in 2004. It is the women's equivalent of the Coupe de Côte d'Ivoire for men.

Finals

Most successful clubs

See also
 Ivory Coast Women's Championship
 Ivory Coast Women's Federation Cup

External links
 Ivory Coast (Women), List of Cup Winners - rsssf.com

Tun
Football competitions in Ivory Coast
Cup
Women's sport in Ivory Coast